Datuk Kamalanathan s/o Panchanathan (born 18 October 1965) is a Malaysian politician. He is a member of the Malaysian Indian Congress (MIC) in the Barisan Nasional (BN) coalition. He was the former Member of the Parliament of Malaysia for the seat of Hulu Selangor and former Deputy Minister of Education I.

Political life
P. Kamalanathan was elected to Parliament in a 2010 Hulu Selangor by-election after the death of the incumbent member Zainal Abidin Ahmad. The by-election saw the seat shift from Zainal's opposition People's Justice Party (PKR) to the Barisan Nasional. The MIC had sought to field veteran politician and defeated former Hulu Selangor Member of Parliament G. Palanivel, but Barisan Nasional's leaders wanted a lesser-known winnable candidate.

On 16 May 2013, after winning the 2013 general election, P. Kamalanathan was appointed as Deputy Minister of Education and Higher Learning II under the new cabinet of Prime Minister Najib Razak. After a cabinet reshuffle by the Prime Minister Najib Razak on 28 July 2015, P Kamalanathan was promoted and appointed as the Deputy Minister of Education II. He is tri-lingual; English, Bahasa Melayu and Tamil.

In the 2018 general election, P. Kamalanathan failed to be re-elected to the parliament.

Election results

See also

Hulu Selangor (federal constituency)

References

1965 births
Living people
Kuala Lumpur politicians
Malaysian politicians of Indian descent
Malaysian politicians of Tamil descent
Malaysian Hindus
Government ministers of Malaysia
Members of the Dewan Rakyat
Malaysian Indian Congress politicians
21st-century Malaysian politicians
Officers of the Order of the Defender of the Realm